The Belgrade Trophy (Serbian: Трофеј Београда/Trofej Beograda) is an international basketball competition between national teams, which has been held annually since 2012 and takes place in Belgrade, Serbia each summer, before the big official FIBA tournaments, such as the FIBA EuroBasket, the FIBA World Cup, and the Summer Olympic Games. The tournament is organized by the Basketball Federation of Serbia. The competition is played under FIBA rules.

All five editions of the tournament held so far have been won by Serbia, which has won all ten games it played, by an average margin of 24.8 points. The 2017 edition of the tournament was the first one with three participating teams competing in a round-robin tournament, replacing previous format with four participating teams competing in a single-elimination tournament.

Standings

Results by country

Tournament history

2012

Semifinals

3rd place match

Finals

2013

Semifinals

3rd place match

Finals

2014

Semifinals

3rd place match

Finals

2015

Semifinals

3rd place match

Finals

2016
Belgrade Trophy was not held in 2016, due to the participation of Serbia national team at the 2016 FIBA World Olympic Qualifying Tournament – Belgrade, one of three 2016 FIBA World Olympic Qualifying Tournaments for Men, which was held in Kombank Arena in July 2016.

2017

Standings

|}

Matches

2018–2021
Belgrade Trophy was not held in 2018 since there was no major FIBA-organized international tournament scheduled for that year. In 2019, no tournament was held prior to the 2019 FIBA Basketball World Cup, and in 2020, 2020 Summer Olympics were postponed due to the COVID-19 pandemic, marking another year with no major international basketball competition. In 2021, like in 2016, instead of the Belgrade Trophy, one of the 2020 Olympic Qualifying Tournaments was held in Belgrade. After four consecutive years with no tournament held, and no official announcements regarding the tournament from the Basketball Federation of Serbia, the future of Belgrade Trophy remains uncertain.

See also 
 Acropolis Tournament
 Basketball at the Summer Olympics
 FIBA Basketball World Cup
 FIBA Asia Cup
 FIBA Diamond Ball
 Adecco Cup
 Marchand Continental Championship Cup
 Stanković Cup
 William Jones Cup

Sponsors
Acıbadem Healthcare Group

References

External links
 Belgrade Trophy 2014

International basketball competitions hosted by Serbia
Sport in Belgrade
Basketball competitions in Europe between national teams
Basketball in Belgrade